Arkady Leontiiovych Kiselev (Ukrainian: Аркадій Леонтійович Кисельов; 1880 in Kiev – 22 September 1938, in Kiev) was a politician of the Ukrainian Soviet Socialist Republic, serving as its Prosecutor General from 1935 to 1936.

Life
He was born into a family of workers. He graduated from a city school and received a secondary education.

A member of the RSDLP(B) since 1902, he took part in the revolutionary movement, was arrested in 1902 and 1904, and went abroad in 1904.

He was born Aaron Kesler Lazarevic and early in his life lived in the United States of America. He returned with his family to Russia in 1917.

Since 1921, he has been working in the party and economic spheres in the Chelyabinsk province and the Donetsk basin.

In 1929-1930, he was the head of the Stalinist District Control Commission of the CP(B)U-RSU in Donbas.

Until January 1934, he was the secretary of the Party Board of the Central Control Commission of the CP(B)U.

From May 26, 1934, to January 1935, he was People's Commissar of Supply of the Ukrainian SSR.

Sources
http://www.history.org.ua/?encyclop&termin=Kyselov_A

1880 births
1938 deaths
Politicians from Kyiv
People from Kiev Governorate
Emigrants from the Russian Empire to the United States
General Prosecutors of Ukraine
Old Bolsheviks
Central Committee of the Communist Party of Ukraine (Soviet Union) members
Members of the All-Ukrainian Central Executive Committee
Ukrainian Trotskyists
Ukrainian Jews
Red Guards (Russia)
Great Purge victims from Ukraine
Jews executed by the Soviet Union
Soviet propagandists